Tzina (Georgia) Lamprousi (born January 27, 1993, in Athens) is a female professional volleyball player from Greece, who is a member of the Greece women's national volleyball team. At club level, she plays in Hellenic Volley League for Greek powerhouse Olympiacos Piraeus since July 2013.

Career 
Tzina (Georgia) Lamprousi, originating from Assos  Preveza, began the sport at a young age. She began in 2002 with Aerobic gymnastics, and was actually a member of the Hellenic national team. But after six years she was forced to leave this sport because of her height, and at the instigation of the coaches of the sports high school where she was studying, she started playing volleyball. In 2008, at the age of 15 years old became a member of the Junior team of Iraklis Kifisia (Hellenic 1st division club), and a few months later was a member of the Hellenic National Junior Team.
In 2008–09 season won with Iraklis the Hellenic Girls Championship and in 2010-11 the Hellenic Junior Women Championship. Gradually she was promoted to the first team of Iraklis, participating in the Hellenic Women's 1st division Championship.

The summer of 2013 Tzina Lamprousi moved to Greek powerhouse Olympiacos Piraeus. With Olympiacos Lamprousi has won since then 6 Hellenic Championships, 6 Hellenic Cups, the silver medal of the 2016–17 CEV Women's Challenge Cup but most importantly the golden medal of the 2017–18 CEV Women's Challenge Cup, with 22 winning block points in the whole competition, being all these years a permanent member of her squad as central blocker.

International career 
In 2009, at the age of 16 Tzina Lamprousi, was selected for the Hellenic Junior Women's National team and competed in the preliminary round of the relative European Championship.
In the Hellenic Women's National Team deputed in the preliminary round of the 2011 European Championship, and since then she is a basic member of the National Squad, having participated in the Mediterranean Games of 2013, and in any other competition, such as the preliminary rounds of European and World Championships, in the European League and in many friendlies as well. In 2018 Mediterranean Games she won the silver medal as a permanent member of the Hellenic National Team. In 2019 she competed with the Hellenic National Team in the final phase of the European Championship, participating in all 6 games of Greece.

Sporting achievements

National Team
 2010  Balkan Junior Women's Championship
 2018  Mediterranean Games

Clubs

International competitions
 2016/2017 : CEV Women's Challenge Cup, with Olympiacos S.F. Piraeus
 2017/2018 : CEV Women's Challenge Cup, with Olympiacos S.F. Piraeus

National championships
 2011/2012  Hellenic Championship, with Iraklis Kifisia 
 2012/2013  Hellenic Championship, with raklis Kifisia 
 2013/2014  Hellenic Championship, with Olympiacos Piraeus
 2014/2015  Hellenic Championship, with Olympiacos Piraeus
 2015/2016  Hellenic Championship, with Olympiacos Piraeus
 2016/2017  Hellenic Championship, with Olympiacos Piraeus
 2017/2018  Hellenic Championship, with Olympiacos Piraeus
 2018/2019  Hellenic Championship, with Olympiacos Piraeus

National trophies
 2013/2014  Hellenic Cup, with Olympiacos Piraeus
 2014/2015  Hellenic Cup, with Olympiacos Piraeus
 2015/2016  Hellenic Cup, with Olympiacos Piraeus
 2016/2017  Hellenic Cup, with Olympiacos Piraeus
 2017/2018  Hellenic Cup, with Olympiacos Piraeus
 2018/2019  Hellenic Cup, with Olympiacos Piraeus

Individuals
 2015 Greek Cup Final four: M.V.P.

References

External links
 Tzina Lamprousi's profile www.greekvolley.gr 
 Lamprousi's profile at CEV web site www.cev.eu
 Olympiacos Women's Volleyball team at Olympiacos official web site (www.olympiacossfp.gr)
 An interview with Tzina Lamprousi at www.contra.gr 
 M.V.P. of Hellenic Cup final 2016 - Interview at www.joinsports.gr 
 Lamprousi move to Olympiacos at www.olympiacos.org
 Hellenic Women National Team - caps www.volleyball.gr
 Profile at women.volleybox.net

1993 births
Living people
Olympiacos Women's Volleyball players
Greek women's volleyball players
Volleyball players from Athens
Mediterranean Games silver medalists for Greece
Mediterranean Games medalists in volleyball
Competitors at the 2018 Mediterranean Games
21st-century Greek women